In sociology, authority is the legitimate or socially approved power which one person or a group possesses and practices over another. The element of legitimacy is vital to the notion of authority and is the main means by which authority is distinguished from the more general concept of power.

Power can be exerted by the use of force or violence. Authority, by contrast, depends on the acceptance by subordinates of the right of those above them to give them orders or directives.

Types
The types of political authority were first defined by Max Weber in his essay "Politics as a Vocation" and his other writings in 1919–1920.  In this essay he emphasized that the political authority that controlled the state can be composed of the following types of authority, or what is called in German, Herrschaft.

Traditional authority: Power legitimized by respect for long-established cultural patterns.

Charismatic authority: Power legitimized by extraordinary personal abilities that inspire devotion and obedience.

Rational-legal authority: Also known as bureaucratic authority, is when power is legitimized by legally enacted rules or regulations.

Max Weber on authority

Max Weber, in his sociological and philosophical work, identified and distinguished three types of legitimate domination (Herrschaft in German, which generally means 'domination' or 'rule'), that have sometimes been rendered in English translation as types of authority, because domination is not seen as a political concept in the first place. Weber defined domination (authority) as the chance of commands being obeyed by a specifiable group of people.  Legitimate authority is that which is recognized as legitimate and justified by both the ruler and the ruled. Legitimated rule results in what Weber called the monopoly over the use of coercive violence in a given territory.  In the modern world, such authority is typically delegated to police and the court system.

Weber divided legitimate authority into three types:

The first type discussed by Weber is legal-rational authority. It is that form of authority which depends for its legitimacy on formal rules and established laws of the state, which are usually written down and are often very complex. The power of the rational-legal authority is mentioned in the constitution. Modern societies depend on legal-rational authority. Government officials are the best example of this form of authority, which is prevalent all over the world.
The second type of authority, traditional authority, derives from long-established customs, habits and social structures. When power passes from one generation to another, it is known as traditional authority. The rule of hereditary monarchs furnishes an obvious example. The Tudor dynasty in England and the ruling families of Mewar in Rajasthan (India) are some examples of traditional authority.
 The third form of authority is charismatic authority. Here, the charisma of the individual or the leader plays an important role. Charismatic authority is that authority which is derived from the leader's claims to a higher power or inspiration that is supported by his or her followers. Examples in this regard can be NT Rama Rao, a matinee idol, who went on to become one of the most powerful Chief Ministers of Andhra Pradesh.

History has witnessed several social movements or revolutions against a system of traditional or legal-rational authority started by Charismatic authorities. According to Weber, what distinguishes authority from coercion, force and power on the one hand, and leadership, persuasion and influence on the other hand, is legitimacy. Superiors, he states, feel that they have a right to issue commands; subordinates perceive an obligation to obey (see also Milgram experiment). Social scientists agree that authority is but one of several resources available to incumbents in formal positions. For example, a Head of State is dependent upon a similar nesting of authority. His legitimacy must be acknowledged, not just by citizens, but by those who control other valued resources: his immediate staff, his cabinet, military leaders and in the long run, the administration and political apparatus of the entire society.

Authority can be created expressly when public entities act publicly, using the same means to communicate the grant of authority to their agents that they use to communicate this to third parties, apparent authority describes the situation when a principal has placed restrictions on an agent that are not known to a third party, and restrictions on government agents are accomplished in the open, through laws and regulations. In this setting, all parties concerned is assumed or supposed to know the laws and regulations of government.

Recently the concept of authority has also been discussed as a guiding principle in human-machine interaction design.

Children and authority attributes 
Authority and its attributes have been identified as of particular relevance to children as they regard their parents and teachers. The three attributes of authority have been described as status, specialist skills or knowledge, and social position. Children consider the type of command, the characteristics of the authority figure, and the social context when making authority conclusions.

Although children regard these three types of authority attributes, they first assess the legitimacy of the authority figure in question using the nature of the commands they give. For example, a teacher that does not appear to have legitimate power from the child’s perspective (perhaps because she or he cannot control the class well) will not be obeyed. Regarding parenting, authoritative parents who are warm and high in behavioral control but low in psychological control are more likely to be seen as having legitimate authority by the child, and will believe themselves that they have a duty to obey them and internalize their values.

In social science 
Hofstede Insights details "Power Distance" as: "Power distance is defined as the extent to which the less powerful members of institutions and organisations within a country expect and accept that power is distributed unequally", which can be interpreted as respect for authority. Generally, ex-communist countries, poor countries, and non-Protestant countries have the highest power distance (respect for inequality in the distribution of power). According to Hofstede Insights 2021 country comparison, all countries with power distance below 50 are Western Protestant democracies, except for Austria.

See also 
 Authority
 Authority bias
 List of sociology topics
 Milgram experiment (sociological experiments measuring obedience to authority figures)
 Sociology
 Soft power
 Power distance
 Tripartite classification of authority

References

External links
http://www.swarthmore.edu/SocSci/rbannis1/AmCult/H47%236.html
https://web.archive.org/web/20081014082304/http://www.soci.canterbury.ac.nz/resources/glossary/authorit.shtml

 
Social philosophy
Sociological terminology